St. Gabriel is a city in Iberville Parish, Louisiana, United States. The city of St. Gabriel includes the areas of Sunshine and Carville. Part of the Baton Rouge metropolitan statistical area, it had a population of 6,677 at the 2010 U.S. census, and 6,433 at the 2020 census.

St. Gabriel was incorporated as a town in 1994 and received city designation in 2001. It is located on the east bank of the Mississippi River, approximately 12 miles south of Baton Rouge. Bayou Manchac serves as the official boundary between St. Gabriel, Ascension Parish, and East Baton Rouge Parish. Over the years, the area has been transformed from a primarily agricultural economy to one that is now dominated by the petrochemical industry.

History
This area is in a part of Acadiana, which was founded by the Acadians, after their expulsion from Nova Scotia in the mid-18th century.

At the end of 1769 Luis de Unzaga, then governor of New Orleans and from 1770 also of Louisiana, authorized Father Dragobert to create a parish for the Acadians on land near the Mississippi and located between Baton Rouge, Iberville and the town of Gonzales. Between 1771 and 1773, Governor Luis de Unzaga granted the land and the necessary permits for its construction; the construction could be carried out between 1774 and 1776, still within the period of the government of Luis de Unzaga.

In 2008 during Hurricane Gustav, St. Gabriel Catholic Church's steeple was destroyed. It is one of Louisiana's oldest churches, and tradition sets the date of the formation of the parish in 1769.

Geography

According to the United States Census Bureau, the town has a total area of 29.0 square miles (75.0 km), of which 28.7 square miles (74.4 km) is land and 0.2 square mile (0.6 km) (0.76%) is water. St. Gabriel sits along the east bank of the Mississippi River, between the boundaries of Ascension Parish and East Baton Rouge Parish. The communities of Carville and Sunshine are within the city limits.

Demographics

As of the 2020 United States census, there were 6,433 people, 1,635 households, and 962 families residing in the city.

According to the 2019 American Community Survey, the racial and ethnic makeup of the city was 67.5% Black and African American, 31.0% non-Hispanic white, 0.4% American Indian and Alaska Native, 0.1% Asian, 0.1% some other race, and 1.0% two or more races. Hispanic and Latin Americans of any race were 1.9% of the population. In 2000, the racial makeup of the town was 27.08% White, 71.98% African American, 0.05% Native American, 0.33% Asian, 0.02% Pacific Islander, 0.22% from other races, and 0.33% from two or more races; Hispanic and Latin Americans of any race were 1.12% of the population.

At the 2000 United States census, there were 5,514 people, 898 households, and 639 families residing in the town. There were 898 households, out of which 35.6% had children under the age of 18 living with them, 39.0% were married couples living together, 26.9% had a female householder with no husband present, and 28.8% were non-families. 25.2% of all households were made up of individuals, and 7.7% had someone living alone who was 65 years of age or older. The average household size was 2.79 and the average family size was 3.36. In 2019, there were 1,635 households with an average of 2.53 people per household. St. Gabriel had a median age of 37.7, and 88.2% of the population were aged 18 and older.

In 2019, the median household income was $48,259, up from $25,352 at the 2000 census. The per capita income was $17,153, up from $8,952 in 2000. Males had a median income of $41,125 versus $34,313 for females, and 20.0% of the population lived at or below the poverty line.

Government and infrastructure

The Louisiana Department of Public Safety and Corrections operates two prisons, Elayn Hunt Correctional Center and Louisiana Correctional Institute for Women (LCIW), in St. Gabriel. LCIW houses the female death row.

Education

Primary and secondary schools
Iberville Parish School Board operates the East Iberville School, a K–12 school, in St. Gabriel. For a long time it was the only school in St. Gabriel. The Mathematics, Science, and Arts Academy - East opened in St. Gabriel in the fall of 2008.

Some residents send their children to private schools in Greater Baton Rouge and in the Gonzales, Louisiana area.

In 2013 some officials from the City of St. Gabriel announced that they wished to secede from Iberville Parish schools, arguing that their schools were given less attention than warranted.

Public Library
Iberville Parish Library operates the East Iberville Branch Library in St. Gabriel.

References

External links

 City of St. Gabriel

Populated places established in 1761
Cities in Louisiana
Cities in Iberville Parish, Louisiana
Cities in the Baton Rouge metropolitan area
Louisiana populated places on the Mississippi River